Sebti Bounaib is a former professional tennis player who competed for Algeria.

Career
Bounaib played in one Davis Cup tie for Algeria in 1976 and lost both of his rubbers.

References

Living people
Algerian male tennis players
1939 births
Mediterranean Games bronze medalists for Algeria
Competitors at the 1975 Mediterranean Games
Sportspeople from Constantine, Algeria
Mediterranean Games medalists in tennis
21st-century Algerian people
20th-century Algerian people